Holmes Osborne (born November 7, 1947) is an American character actor who has worked in film and television, including notable roles in That Thing You Do! (1996), Donnie Darko (2001) and Southland Tales (2007).

Career
Prior to pursuing an acting career, Osborne had jobs as a car salesman and as an English teacher. In 1966 when still a student at the University of Kansas, he began making training videos and short motivational clips that would typically be shown as business events and seminars. By 1996, he had created over 500 of these videos. He did act in live theater but gave it up around 1983 as the wages were insufficient to support his family, with one of his last theater roles being in the musical Blanco! in summer 1983.

In 1996, Osborne played the protagonist's father in the Tom Hanks-directed musical comedy-drama movie That Thing You Do! and had a recurring role in the HBO miniseries From the Earth to the Moon, broadcast in 1998. Shortly afterwards the following year, he played the role of Gordon LaRiviere in Affliction, filmed during early 1997. Osborne secured the role after submitting an audition tape and did not meet the director until he arrived on set. In 1999, he guest starred, along with Lance Henriksen (reprising his role as Frank Black), in an episode of The X-Files as a necromancer for the Millennium Group. In 2000, he starred as Kirsten Dunst's father in the teen comedy Bring It On.

Osborne then starred as Eddie Darko, the main character's father, in the science fiction drama movie Donnie Darko. He lauded director Richard Kelly's "spontaneity" on set.

He also appeared in the family comedy Cheaper By the Dozen (2003). The following year, he co-starred in the comedy movie Anchorman: The Legend of Ron Burgundy. In 2006, Osborne he appeared as the main villain in the Disney movie Air Buddies. In 2007, he reunited with Donnie Darko director Richard Kelly on the political satire Southland Tales, and again in 2009 on the psychological thriller The Box. Also in 2009, he co-starred in the comedy movie All About Steve.

In 2011, he has a supporting role in the Tom Hanks movie Larry Crowne. He has made appearances on television series such as House M. D., Cold Case, CSI: Miami, Rules of Engagement, Dharma & Greg, and had a recurring role on the ABC science fiction series Invasion.

Personal
Osborne is married to Candace and in 1996, reportedly lived in the same house where he grew up. He is an avid fisherman.

References

External links
 

1947 births
American male film actors
American male television actors
Living people
Male actors from Kansas City, Missouri
20th-century American male actors
21st-century American male actors